"How Many More Years" is a blues song written and originally recorded by Howlin' Wolf in 1951. Recorded at the Memphis Recording Service – which later became the Sun Studio – it was released by Chess Records and reached No. 4 on the Billboard R&B chart.  Musician and record producer T-Bone Burnett has described "How Many More Years" as "in some ways... the first rock’n’roll song".  It was a double-sided hit with "Moanin' at Midnight", which reached No. 10 on the R&B chart.

Recording and release 
After military service, Chester Burnett performed as a blues singer and formed his own band in West Memphis, Arkansas, in 1948, billing himself as "The Howlin' Wolf". He began broadcasting on radio station KWEM in West Memphis, and was brought by Ike Turner to record for Sam Phillips in Memphis, Tennessee.

He recorded "How Many More Years" at the Memphis Recording Service at 706 Union Avenue, Memphis, Tennessee, in or about July 1951, singing and playing harmonica with a band consisting of Ike Turner (piano), Willie Johnson (guitar), and Willie Steele (drums). The repetitious bass-string boogie line resembles the one played in the traditional blues standard "Forty-Four".

Phillips had not yet set up Sun Records and regularly leased his recordings to the Chess label in Chicago. The record was issued as Chess 1479 on 15 August 1951, with "Moanin' at Midnight" as the A-side and "How Many More Years" as the B-side. "Moanin' at Midnight" entered the Billboard R&B chart at No. 10 in November 1951, and was followed four weeks later by "How Many More Years", which became the more popular side. It rose to No. 8 on the Best Selling R&B Records chart in December 1951, and No. 4 on the Most Played Juke Box R&B Records chart on March 1, 1952.

The songwriting for both sides of the record was originally credited to Carl Germany, who was a disc jockey and dance promoter in Chicago. The Chess label occasionally used composer credits on their records to repay favors to local businessmen who had helped their record sales. Later reissues of the recordings have given the songwriting credits to Chester Burnett.

Following the record's success, Burnett moved to Chicago in late 1952, and developed his career further in clubs and through recordings there, with a new band.

Influence 
Writer Robert Palmer has cited Willie Johnson's electric guitar work on the track as the first use of the power chord. T-Bone Burnett said of the recording:

References 

1951 songs
1951 debut singles
Chess Records singles
Howlin' Wolf songs